Three Husbands  is a 2018 Hong Kong film directed by Fruit Chan, starring Zeng Meihuizi and Chan Charm-man. It is the last instalment of his "prostitution trilogy" which Chan directed from 2000–2018. The other two movies in the trilogy are Durian Durian (Qin Hailu as lead actress, 2000) and Hollywood Hong Kong (Zhou Xun as lead actress, 2001). The three lead actresses starring in his "prostitution trilogy" were nominated as Golden Horse Award for Best Leading Actress for their respective role in a film of the trilogy, and Qin Hailu won the award for her role in Durian Durian.

The film premiered at the 31st Tokyo International Film Festival on 26 October 2018.

Plot
In her boldest performance yet, Zeng Meihuizi stars as a woman who lives on the sea with her three husbands. With an overactive libido, she heartily devotes herself to her work as a prostitute. As in the trilogy’s two previous films, Chan uses the world’s oldest profession to satirise the state of contemporary Hong Kong.

Cast

Zeng Meihuizi as Ah Mui
  Chan Charm-man as Four Eyes / Little Bro
 Keung Mak as Big Bro
 Chan Man-lei as Second Bro
 Sai Man Ho as Fatty
 Larine Tang as Sau Ming
 Xia Ren as Shui

Reception

Awards and nominations

References

External links

Hong Kong fantasy drama films
2010s Cantonese-language films